The Lebanon men's national tennis team represents Lebanon in Davis Cup tennis competition and are governed by the Fédération Libanaise de Tennis.

In 2022 Lebanon competed in World Group II. After their win against Monaco there, they will compete in the World Group I Play-offs in 2023.

History
Lebanon competed in its first Davis Cup in 1957.

Current team (2022)

 Benjamin Hassan
 Hady Habib
 Hasan Ibrahim
 Roey Tabet
 Tamim Hallak

See also
Davis Cup
Lebanon Fed Cup team

External links

Tennis Academy in Lebanon

Davis Cup teams
Davis Cup
Davis Cup